The Grande Ronde River ( or, less commonly) is a tributary of the Snake River,  long, in northeastern Oregon and southeastern Washington in the United States. It drains an area southeast of the Blue Mountains and northwest of the Wallowa Mountains, on the Columbia Plateau. It flows through the agricultural Grande Ronde Valley in its middle course and through a series of scenic canyons in its lower course.

Course
It flows generally north along the east side of the Blue Mountains, then east, past La Grande, then generally northeast through the Grande Ronde Valley in a meandering course between the Blue Mountains and the Wallowa Mountains, receiving Catherine Creek east of La Grande.

Approximately  miles upstream from its mouth on the Snake river, it crosses into southeastern Washington. It traverses the extreme southeast corner of the state.

River modifications

History

In the early 19th century, the valley of the river was inhabited by Nez Perce, Umatilla, Walla Walla, and Cayuse tribes of Native Americans. Numerous archaeological sites are on the public land around the river.

The Grande Ronde River was given its name sometime before 1821 by French Canadian voyageurs working for the Montreal-based fur trading North West Company. Grande Ronde is a French name meaning "great round".

A portion Grande Ronde and its valley were part of the Oregon Trail. It was first used by settlers in 1844 when Moses "Black" Harris led his party to the river from Fort Hall and then turned northwest to cross the Blue Mountains. Harris' navigation would be subsequently repeated, becoming a regular part of the Oregon Trail. The river was called the "Grand Round River" by at least one English-speaking traveler.

The river today is a popular destination for hunting, especially for game animals such as mule deer, elk, black bear, cougar, and bighorn sheep. Fishing, rafting and hiking are also popular along the designated Wild and Scenic portion of the river. Most of the middle reaches of the river are inaccessible to motor vehicles.

Fish
The Grande Ronde River supports populations of spring chinook salmon, summer steelhead, bull trout, mountain whitefish, as well as other species.  The river has a sport steelhead fishery and has some tribal fishing for spring chinook.

See also
 List of rivers of Oregon
 List of longest streams of Oregon
 List of rivers of Washington
 Joseph Canyon

References

External links
Grande Ronde Model Watershed
 
 Grande Ronde Wild and Scenic River

Rivers of Oregon
Rivers of Washington (state)
Archaeological sites in Oregon
Archaeological sites in Washington (state)
Wild and Scenic Rivers of the United States
Tributaries of the Snake River
Rivers of Union County, Oregon